Torpoint is a civil parish and town on the Rame Peninsula in southeast Cornwall, England, United Kingdom. It is situated opposite the city of Plymouth across the Hamoaze which is the tidal estuary of the River Tamar.
Torpoint had a population of 8,457 at the 2001 census, decreasing to 8,364 at the 2011 census. Two electoral wards also exist (Torpoint East and Torpoint West). Their combined populations at the same census were 7,717.

Torpoint is linked to Plymouth (and Devonport) by the Torpoint Ferry. The three vessels that operate the service are chain ferries – that is, they are propelled across the river by pulling themselves on fixed chains which lie across the bed of the river. The journey takes about seven minutes.

Origin of name
It is said that Torpoint's name is derived from Tar Point, a name given because of the initial industry on the west bank of the Hamoaze. However this is actually a nickname given by workers, Torpoint meaning "rocky headland".

History
Torpoint is an eighteenth-century planned town. The grid-based design for the town was commissioned by Reginald Pole Carew in the Parish of Antony in 1774. His family continue to have a strong influence in the area, having become the Carew Poles in the twentieth century, and still reside at their family seat, Antony House.

In 1796 Torpoint was the setting for a shooting battle between the crew of a government vessel, the Viper, and a large party of armed liquor smugglers, in which one person was killed and five people seriously wounded.

Due to the presence of Devonport Dockyard, the town grew as Dockyard workers settled there. The establishment of the Royal Navy's main training facility, HMS Raleigh also increased the population of Torpoint.

Notable people from Torpoint
See :Category:People from Torpoint
John Langdon Down was born in Torpoint in 1828. He later described the medical condition which is now referred to as Down syndrome. He was called back on a number of occasions to help his father in his local business until his father's death in 1853.
 Jack Stephens  a footballer for AFC Bournemouth.

Education
Educational institutions in Torpoint include:

Torpoint Infant School — a medium-large infant school.
Carbeile Junior School — a large primary school.
Torpoint Community College, a small secondary school.

Sport and leisure
Torpoint has a non-league football club, Torpoint Athletic F.C., which plays at The Mill.

Twinning
Torpoint is twinned with Benodet (Benoded) in Brittany, France.

Town Council 
1894 The Torpoint Town Council was established with Mr Joseph Shepheard as its Chairman.

Cllr Ron Widdecombe was the first Mayor of Torpoint

The Town Council has Cllr Miss Rachel Evans BEM as the town Mayor and Cllr Gary Davis as the deputy Mayor.

The Town Council is made up of 14 East Ward Councillors and 1 West Ward Councillor.

References

External links

  Torpoint website
 Cornwall Record Office Online Catalogue for Torpoint

Towns in Cornwall
Civil parishes in Cornwall
Populated coastal places in Cornwall